Jon Hellesnes (born 16 September 1939) is a Norwegian philosopher, novelist and essayist.

He was appointed professor of philosophy at the University of Tromsø in 1985. He is a member of the Norwegian Academy of Science and Letters.

Selected bibliography
This is a list of his most notable works:

Academic
Sosialisering og teknokrati (1975)
Jakta etter svikaren (1978)
Hermeneutikk og kultur (1988)
René Descartes (1999)
Om Hans Skjervheim (1999)

Other
Carolus, klovnen (novel, 1982)
Farar i metropolis (essays, 1984)
Den postmoderne anstalten (novel, 1986)
Maska bak andletet (essays, 2002)
Illusjon? (essays, 2004)
Om livstolkning (essays, 2007).

References

1939 births
Living people
Norwegian philosophers
20th-century Norwegian novelists
21st-century Norwegian novelists
Norwegian essayists
Academic staff of the University of Tromsø
Members of the Norwegian Academy of Science and Letters
20th-century essayists
21st-century essayists